Young is a village in the Canadian province of Saskatchewan within the Rural Municipality of Morris No. 312. The economy is dominated by local agriculture and the nearby Mosaic Potash mine.

History 
Young came into being with the coming of the Grand Trunk Pacific Railway. Young incorporated as a village on June 7, 1910. It was named for F.G. Young, a land agent. 

A limestone kiln producing 1000 bushels of lime a day was established in the town at the northwest end of 2 Avenue.

It has a 3 sheet curling rink with artificial ice and hockey arena, a swimming pool, golf course, ball diamonds and playground.

A fire destroyed the village's oldest building, the former Young Hotel, on November 12, 2011.  The hotel was built in 1910.

Demographics 

See also
List of communities in Saskatchewan
List of villages in Saskatchewan

References

External links 

Villages in Saskatchewan
Morris No. 312, Saskatchewan
Division No. 11, Saskatchewan
1908 establishments in Saskatchewan
Populated places established in 1908